Jerome Dunstan "Jerry" Travers (May 19, 1887 – March 29, 1951) was one of the leading amateur golfers of the early 20th century. He won the U.S. Amateur in 1907, 1908, 1912 and 1913, the New Jersey Amateur three times, and the Metropolitan Amateur (New York) five times. He was regarded as one of the finest match play golfers of his time and had a famous rivalry with Walter Travis. He won the 1915 U.S. Open.

Early life
Travers was born on May 19, 1887 in New York City, New York.

Golf career
On September 16, 1905, a then 18-year-old Travers partnered with Herbert Strong to tie for second place, shooting 72, in a four-ball tournament held at Fox Hills Golf Club on Staten Island as part of the 1905 Metropolitan Open. The stroke play portion of the tournament was won by Alex Smith. 

In 1915 Travers won the U.S. Open at Baltusrol Golf Club, making him the second of the five amateurs to win the event. It was his only top ten finish in four appearances at the U.S. Open – he never entered the tournament again once he had won it.

Although all of Travers' notable victories came as an amateur, he later became a teaching professional and gave exhibitions.

Death and legacy
Travers died on March 29, 1951 in East Hartford, Connecticut. He is remembered as one of the finest amateur golfers of all time.  He won the U.S. Amateur four times and the U.S. Open in 1915.  He was inducted into the World Golf Hall of Fame in 1976.

Tournament wins
1904 Nassau Invitational
1906 Metropolitan Amateur, Eastern Scholastic, Lynnewood Hall Cup
1907 U.S. Amateur, Metropolitan Amateur, New Jersey Amateur
1908 U.S. Amateur, New Jersey Amateur, Morris County Invitation Tournament, Lynnewood Hall Cup
1910 Montclair G.C. Invitational
1911 Metropolitan Amateur, New Jersey Amateur
1912 U.S. Amateur, Metropolitan Amateur
1913 U.S. Amateur, Metropolitan Amateur, New Jersey Amateur
1914 Prince of Wales Medal
1915 U.S. Open, Lynnewood Hall Cup

Major championships

Professional wins (1)

Amateur wins (4)

Results timeline

Note: Travers played in only the U.S. Open, U.S. Amateur, and The Amateur Championship.
NT = No tournament
DNP = Did not play
"T" indicates a tie for a place
R256, R128, R64, R32, R16, QF, SF = Round in which player lost in match play
Green background for wins. Yellow background for top-10

Sources: U.S. Open and U.S. Amateur, Amateur Championship: 1909, 1914

References

External links

American male golfers
Amateur golfers
Winners of men's major golf championships
World Golf Hall of Fame inductees
Golfers from New York (state)
Sportspeople from New York City
1887 births
1951 deaths